Příkrý is a municipality and village in Semily District in the Liberec Region of the Czech Republic. It has about 200 inhabitants.

Administrative parts
The village of Škodějov is an administrative part of Příkrý.

References

Villages in Semily District